Biskoupky is a municipality and village in Brno-Country District in the South Moravian Region of the Czech Republic. It has about 200 inhabitants.

History
The first written mention of Biskoupky is from 1131.

Notable people
Vítězslav Nezval (1900–1958), poet and writer

References

External links

Villages in Brno-Country District